Yob Nation, by English author Francis Gilbert, is a non-fiction book that studies the yob culture in modern British society and to what degree it is increasing.

First published in March 2006, the book has received distinctly mixed reviews from critics for the way it defines yobs and the way it links everyday thugs to people in the upper echelons of society. Francis Gilbert starts with his own encounters with yobs in his childhood and while working as a teacher, before moving beyond his own experiences to investigate the thuggery and foul behaviour that exist in other parts of the UK.

See also
I'm a Teacher, Get Me Out of Here

External links
Review of Yob Nation by Decca Aitkenhead in The Guardian, retrieved 14 July 2016.

2006 non-fiction books
Books about the United Kingdom